Lucio Urtubia Jiménez (1931–2020) was a Spanish anarchist known for his practice of expropriative anarchism through forgery. At times compared to Robin Hood, Urtubia carried out bank robberies and forgeries throughout the 1960s and 1970s. In the words of Albert Boadella, "Lucio is a Quijote that did not fight against wind mills, but against a true giant".
He was one of the main participants in an action to raise funds for his political formation, based on a scam against the First National City Bank by forging traveler's checks with printing plates of which he was the author. Hundreds of counterfeit traveler's checks were distributed throughout Europe and several Latin American countries between January 1980 and December 1982. The so-called "money recovery operations", of which the City Bank scam was a part, were used to collect of funds destined to support those who struggled and needed it. Following the dismantling of the counterfeiting infrastructure, the French police were unable to recover the printing plates for the checks, forcing the City Bank and the French government to make a pact with Urtubia.

Urtubia died in his home city of Paris, France on 18 July 2020, aged 89.

Legacy 
The Basque filmmakers  and  created , a 2007 documentary on Urtubia's life.

The 2022 film Un hombre de acción (A Man of Action) was based on his life.

See also
Enric Duran
Miguel García
Adolfo Kaminsky

References

Further reading

External links

 Official site for the film Lucio, featuring trailer
 Lucio, The Good Bandit: Reflections of an Anarchist
 Interview with Lucio Urtubia: Robbing banks is an honour for me (Euskara)
 An anarchist in the Paris of the resistance (Spanish)

1931 births
2020 deaths
Spanish expatriates in France
Anarchist partisans
Illegalists
Spanish bank robbers
Forgers
Spanish anarchists
Spanish prisoners and detainees
People from Tudela (comarca)
Spanish revolutionaries
Spanish rebels
Spanish anti-fascists
Spanish anti-capitalists
Spanish fraudsters